Bloomfield is a census-designated place in Sonoma County, California, U.S. It is located in a rural area about  southwest of Santa Rosa at the junction of Bloomfield Road and Valley Ford Road. Americano Creek flows westward along the south edge of the town.

History

Bloomfield is located on part of Rancho Cañada de Pogolimi.  In 1853, William Zellhardt built a house on the site of present-day Bloomfield, which attracted other immigrants and led to plans for a town in 1856.  At one point in the late 1850s, Bloomfield was the second largest town in Sonoma County, and in 1877 it had four hotels and a population of 250. However, the town never recovered from being bypassed by the railroads, and its growth tapered off.

Geography
According to the United States Census Bureau, the CDP covers an area of 8.1 square miles (21.1 km2), 99.92% of it land and 0.08% of it water.

Demographics

The 2010 United States Census reported that Bloomfield had a population of 345. The racial makeup of the CDP was 81.7% White, 1.2% Asian, 15.1% from other races, and 2.0% from two or more races. 18.0% of the population was Hispanic or Latino of any race.

The Census reported that 100% of the population lived in households.

There were 135 households, out of which 29 (21.5%) had children under the age of 18 living in them, 79 (58.5%) were opposite-sex married couples living together, 12 (8.9%) had a female householder with no husband present, 7 (5.2%) had a male householder with no wife present.  There were 11 (8.1%) unmarried opposite-sex partnerships, and 1 (0.7%) same-sex married couples or partnerships. 25 households (18.5%) were made up of individuals, and 10 (7.4%) had someone living alone who was 65 years of age or older. The average household size was 2.56.  There were 98 families (72.6% of all households); the average family size was 2.86.

The population was spread out, with 56 people (16.2%) under the age of 18, 30 people (8.7%) aged 18 to 24, 74 people (21.4%) aged 25 to 44, 123 people (35.7%) aged 45 to 64, and 62 people (18.0%) who were 65 years of age or older.  The median age was 47.4 years. For every 100 females, there were 84.5 males.  For every 100 females age 18 and over, there were 97.9 males.

There were 143 housing units at an average density of 17.6 per square mile (6.8/km2), of which 65.9% were owner-occupied and 34.1% were occupied by renters. The homeowner vacancy rate was 0%; the rental vacancy rate was 2.1%. 63.8% of the population lived in owner-occupied housing units and 36.2% lived in rental housing units.

References

External links
 List of headstones in Bloomfield Cemetery

Census-designated places in Sonoma County, California
Census-designated places in California